Torquay is a seaside resort in Victoria, Australia, which faces Bass Strait, 21 km south of Geelong and is the gateway to the Great Ocean Road. It is bordered on the west by Spring Creek and its coastal features include Point Danger and Zeally Bay.  At the 2021 census, Torquay had a population of 18,534.

History
Torquay is situated on Wadawurrung country which is part of the Kulin nation that surrounds Port Phillip Bay. From the 1860s, picnickers began to frequent the location, which was originally known as Spring Creek, after the watercourse along its south-western edge, but it was named Puebla in the 1882 Victorian Municipal Directory. James Follett, who settled there in 1871, came from Torquay, the seaside town in Devon, England, and at his suggestion the name Torquay was officially adopted in 1892. The Post Office opened on 20 August 1894. On 3 April 1908, the Spring Creek bridge was built, connecting the town to Anglesea.

In 1891, the Joseph H. Scammell sailing ship struck the reef near Point Danger in Torquay and subsequently became wedged on the reef and as a result the ship broke up in the heavy seas. The cargo of the Scammell was washed onto the beach of Torquay and was looted. The anchors of the Scammell are still on display at the Torquay front beach and the Torquay boat ramp.

In 1900, a primary school was opened in the newly built Presbyterian church, moving to the recreation hall in 1901, a permanent school building not opened until 1910. A bowling green, tennis courts and a golf course were opened by the 1920s. The town once had 145 bathing boxes on the main beach. In 1946, the Torquay Surf Life Saving Club was formed, opening their current clubrooms in 1971 after the previous one burnt down. Today, it is the oldest and largest club in Victoria.

Recent years have seen increased development of the area. With the 'old town' between the highway and the beach almost fully developed, housing spread to Jan Juc, west of Spring Creek, in the 1970s, and new estates opened up to the north of the town after the 1980s. There was conflict between long-term residents and those behind some developments, in particular over the former Torquay Primary School site on Bristol and Boston Roads, which was sold by the government for luxury apartments and an expanded shopping centre, instead of being retained for community uses. In 2001, The Sands golf club and residential development commenced construction to the north west of the town on the site of the former Torquay Tip, which closed in the early 1990s. The resort opened in 2004.

The magazine History Matters produced by Torquay Museum Without Walls continues to document the history of Torquay.

Climate
Torquay has an oceanic climate (Köppen climate classification: Cfb), with warm-summer Mediterranean climate tendencies (Köppen climate classification: Csb). Summers are warm, though just barely with cool nights. Winters consist of cool days with chilly nights.

Attractions

The Torquay area is famous for its surf beaches, with Jan Juc and the world-famous Bells Beach located on the town's south-west outskirts. Other popular beaches are Point Impossible Beach and Southside Beach. It was home to the popular Offshore Festival in the late 1990s.  Many of the world's most famous surf companies have their home in Torquay, including Rip Curl and Quiksilver- all of which make up part of the Surf Coast Plaza, which provides shopping and eating, as well as the Surf World Museum.

Torquay's population usually triples between January and end of February, when the school holidays end; the town also hosts end of year Schoolies week celebrations, joint with Lorne, Victoria's most active Schoolies destination.

The Australian National Surfing Museum is also located in Torquay.

Facilities

Torquay's local schools are Torquay P-6 College (formerly Torquay Primary School), St. Therese Catholic Primary School, Torquay Coast Primary School (formerly Torquay North Primary School) and Surf Coast Secondary College. Torquay Primary School was once located in the 'old town', being moved across from St. Therese in October 2001. The same year a review on the provision of Secondary Schooling in Torquay was commenced, and in 2003 it was recommended that Torquay Primary School become a P-9 school (Torquay College) doing so in 2009, in 2012 it reverted to a standalone primary school.
The secondary years split from Torquay College in 2012 to form Surf Coast Secondary College which moved to a standalone campus in Torquay North at the start of 2014.
In October 2007, The new Torquay Police Station opened at the corner of the Surfcoast highway and central avenue. The new Police station was built at a cost of $7.8 million and is considered to be a state-of-the-art facility.

Areas of Torquay

Frog Hollow

Frog Hollow is in the north west of Torquay.

The estate has been developed on the site of a water catchment which has been drained.

Ocean Views

Ocean Views is in the south of Torquay.

The area was developed from 2000 when the first homes were built. It was originally a sheep and cattle grazing and farming area, known as Hard Man's land because of its rocky and hilly landscape making it difficult to graze on.

It is now primarily residential, backing onto Spring Creek, where a proposed development with capacity for another 20,000 people was rejected in April 2009. It has a football oval and a golf club backing onto it.

The area has a V-line bus stop, the bus running to Warrnambool or to Geelong, three summer bus run stops, a post office box and a park, Spring Creek Play Park. Walking access across the river to the football ground used to be difficult until in 2007 the shire built a footbridge connecting the reserve and the edge of the suburb, which is only around a 1.5 km radius. Ocean Views also have a BMX park.

The area is known for its high number of families.

Wombah Park
Wombah Park is in the north east of Torquay and is home to about 1000 residents.

The Church Estate
Once owned by the Catholic Church, The Church Estate is bounded by Spring Creek Reserve, Spring Creek and Torquay Road and was developed in the 1960s.

Zeally Bay
Zeally Bay is east of Torquay. The bay and Zeally Point were named after Richard Zeally, a squatter who lived in the area from 1851 on his property named South Beach. Zeally Bay hosts a yachting club, a fishing club, Fishermans Beach, Taylor Park - a public  park and the Crowne Plaza Torquay, a multimillion-dollar resort and plaza which was built on the site of the old Zeally Bay Caravan Park. In 2004 the Zeally Bay caravan park had been sold by the owners due to increasing land tax costs, to a developer who said they would build a retirement village.

Sport
Torquay is best known for the sport of surfing. Popular surf spots include Torquay Surf Beach, Draino's and Fisho's. The Torquay Boardriders Club represents Torquay surfers in local and national competitions.

The town has an Australian Rules football team, the Torquay Tigers, competing in the Bellarine Football League playing their home games at Spring Creek Reserve. There is also a Youth Football and Netball Club, Surf Coast Suns, based at the Banyul-Warri Fields sporting precinct, the club was formed in 2016.

There is a soccer team, Surf Coast FC, also playing at Banyul Warri sporting precinct, in the Victorian state league system. The club has submitted an expression of interest in joining the Victorian chapter of the new National Premier League, which will be one of the second-tier leagues in Australia.

Golfers play at the course of the Torquay Golf Club on Great Ocean Road, or at The Sands on Sands Boulevard, an 18-hole championship course designed by Australian golfer Stuart Appleby.

Popular culture
Bells Beach, near Torquay, is the setting for the final part of the 1991 film Point Break starring Patrick Swayze and Keanu Reeves, although no filming actually took place there.

The town was the primary setting for the 2013 film Blinder.

References

External links

Torquay - Official government tourism organization
Torquay Surf Live Saving Club
Torquay,Jan Juc,Bells Beach Visitor Guide - JanJuc.com.au
Torquay Museum Without Walls

Towns in Victoria (Australia)
Coastal towns in Victoria (Australia)
Surfing locations in Victoria (Australia)
Surf Coast Shire